Matt Doherty may refer to:

Footballers
 Matt Doherty (Northern Irish footballer) (fl. 1936–1961), Northern Irish association football player and then manager for Derry City FC
 Matt Doherty (footballer, born 1992), Irish football player signed to Atletico Madrid

Others
 Matt Doherty (actor) (born 1978), American actor
 Matt Doherty (basketball) (born 1962), American basketball coach
 Matthew Doherty (homelessness official), former Executive Director of the United States Interagency Council on Homelessness
 Matthew Doherty, mayor of Belmar, New Jersey